A tuyugh is a classical form of poetry in Central Asia found in classical Turkic poetry.  Poets to use this style include Ali-Shir Nava'i and Gadāʾī, who both wrote in Chaghatay.

References 

Turkish poetry
Arabic and Central Asian poetics
Poetic forms